Culberson is an unincorporated community in Cherokee County, North Carolina, United States. Culberson has a post office with ZIP code 28903. Culberson is also home to a store, a few churches, a flea market, a local winery, several family-owned businesses, and a gas station on the NC/GA state line.

History
Culberson once had a railroad depot and a train that ran from Atlanta to Murphy. The railroad company also operated a hotel in Culberson in the early 1900s. Logging and farming were early forms of employment to the area.

Education
Students K-8 attend Ranger Elementary/Middle School.

Religion

Places of worship
Cornerstone Baptist Church
Culberson Baptist Church
Mt. Pleasant Baptist Church

Nearby communities 
Murphy, North Carolina ( northeast)
Mineral Bluff, Georgia ( southwest}

References

Unincorporated communities in Cherokee County, North Carolina
Unincorporated communities in North Carolina